Fort McMurray Transit is a public transportation system provided by the Regional Municipality of Wood Buffalo, in northeastern Alberta, Canada. Services consist of local scheduled bus routes, specialized transportation for people with disabilities and school buses. Service is focused on the urban area of Fort McMurray, the only major population centre in the region, with some service to outlying communities.

Routes 
17 regular bus routes operate every day. The system has reduced weekend service. Only routes 11, 12, 15, 16, and 99 run on holidays.

Operator 
 Diversified Transportation before 2013
 Tok Transit 2013–2015
 Regional Municipality of Wood Buffalo 2015-present.

See also 

 Public transport in Canada

References

External links 
 Transit History of Alberta Communities, Fort McMurray

Transit agencies in Alberta
Transport in Fort McMurray